Marcus Hernon is a flute player and also a flute maker. He has won two Senior All-Ireland Fleadhs, he has also won a few Junior All-Irelands and a senior Duet with Maeve Donnelly. His band, The Tribes Céilí Band, have never won the All-Ireland Fleadh, but have got numerous first places in the County and Provincial competitions.

Early years
Marcus has been playing since a very young age. Born in Ruisín na Mainíoch, Connemara, Co. Galway, Ireland, Marcus traces his music back to his Granduncle, Peaitín Connelly (Peaitín Pháraic Mháirtín, as he was known locally), in Feenish Island, who used to play the melodeon, a small type of accordion with one row of buttons. Feenish is a small island off the coast of Ruisín na Mainíoch. Marcus' mother Nora Hernon was from the island and used to visit frequently - this was the main source of Marcus' music. Every night on the island there used to be a session (these were known as "the times"). Every time he went to the island, Marcus would learn a few new tunes. He was lucky in the sense that his older brother, P.J. Hernon, played the button accordion and was able to give him help whenever he got stuck in a tune. Later on, when he was a little older, his mother used to buy him 78 records of the musicians of the time and even to this day Marcus' repertoire of tunes consists mostly of the tunes he learnt from these records.

Marcus Hernon At The Moment

Currently Marcus plays most of his gigs in the Connemara area. Over the years he has played in many different countries, including: Austria, Sweden, Denmark, Portugal, Australia, England, Finland and the United States of America. He plays most of his gigs these days with Johnny Connelly, a melodeon player who comes from another island called Inis Bearachain.

As well as playing with Johnny, Marcus also plays with Fíghnis (Gaeilge for Feenish); a band which consists of himself, his brother (P.J.) and Don Stiffe. Don Stiffe plays the guitar and sings, while Marcus and P.J. play the flute and the accordion, respectively. They have recorded one album together called Rabharta (which means Spring Tide in Gaeilge).

He used to play with the Tribes Céilí Band. The Tribes Céilí Band was a traditional Céilí Band with ten members: Yvonne Flynn, Eilish O'Connor, and Áine McGrath on fiddle, Tommy Keane on the uilleann pipes, Jaqueline Mc Carthy on the concertina, Bernie Conneelly on the banjo, P.J. Hernon on the button accordion, Carl Hession on the piano, Benny O'Connor on drums, and Marcus Hernon on the flute. Marcus was the band leader. The Tribes were disbanded in 2008.

Composer

Marcus has also composed a number of Irish tunes. He composed all of the music on his CD The Grouse In The Heather. He also composed two of the tunes on the CD Rabharta. He has composed 25 tunes altogether so far, listed below.

CD-The Grouse In The Heather

The Grouse In The Heather   (Reel)
The Hunted Pheasant         (Reel
The Snipe In The Marsh      (Jig)
The Curlew's Cry            (Jig)
The Invisible Corncrake     (Slow Air)
The Peeping Plover          (Reel)
The Squeaking Woodcock      (Reel)
The Chattering Stormcock    (Hornpipe)
The Musical Thrush          (Hornpipe)
The Herring Gull            (Reel)
The Diving Gannet           (Reel)
The Golden Plover           (Jig)
The Bobbing Sandpiper       (Jig)
The Linnet's Chorus         (Waltz)
The Beautiful Goldfinch     (Waltz)
The Hovering Kestrel        (Reel)
The Lady's Falcon           (Reel)
The Lonely Bittern          (Slow Air)
The Nesting Goldcrest       (Jig)
The Warbling Robin          (Barn-Dance)
The Kingfisher's Delight    (Reel)
The Dark-eyed Raven         (Reel)
The Barefaced Crow          (Reel)

CD-Rabharta

The Lively Wagtail          (Reel)
The Patient Heron           (Waltz)

Flute Maker

Marcus also makes the flutes. He makes these flutes in three standard keys, Dmajor, Ebmajor and Bbmajor. He makes two different types of flute, Pratten (where the upper middle and lower middle are in one piece) and Rudell & Rose (where the upper middle and lower middle are separated by a joint). Marcus uses a few different types of timber in the making of his flutes, depending on what he has in stock, i.e. African Blackwood (Black Ebony), Rio Rosewood and Cooktown Ironwood. He makes the cases for these flutes from Cherrywood.

Discography

References

Traditional music
1959 births
Living people